Qatar Insurance Company (QIC) is a Doha, Qatar-based insurance company specializing in personal and business asset protection. It is the largest insurer in the Persian Gulf region. The company is listed on the Qatar Exchange and has a market capitalization of over US$9.99 billion.

History 
Qatar Insurance Company was conceived and founded by Amiri decree, on March 11, 1964. The Government of Qatar was convinced that the country needed a robust insurance industry to protect the growth in personal and business assets. The currency of Qatar at that time was the Indian rupee(₹) and QIC's paid up capital was  ₹1,500,000.

Products & services 
Qatar Insurance Company S.A.Q., along with its subsidiaries, provides insurance, reinsurance, real estate, and financial advisory services. It operates through six separate entities: Marine & Aviation Insurance, Property & Casualty Insurance, Health & Life Insurance, Real Estate, Advisory, and Investments. The company offers a variety of personal insurance products, including home care, travel care, and automobile insurance.

The company operates in the State of Qatar, the United Arab Emirates (via third-party online distributor), the Sultanate of Oman, the State of Kuwait, the United Kingdom, Switzerland, Bermuda, and Malta. Nearly two-thirds of the company's revenues are generated outside the MENA region.

Profitability 
QIC enjoyed a significant increase in profits in 2014 and the company recommended to its shareholders in February 2015 to distribute cash dividends. The company recommended distribution of cash dividends of 25% and bonus shares of 15%.

Leadership 
Khalid Bin Mohammed Bin Ali Al-Thani is the director and chairman of Qatar Insurance Co. and Khalifa Abdulla Turki Al-Subaey serves as the Group President.

References 

Insurance companies of Qatar
Financial services companies established in 1964
1964 establishments in Qatar
Companies based in Doha
Companies listed on the Qatar Stock Exchange